The Beiyang Fleet (Pei-yang Fleet; , alternatively Northern Seas Fleet) was one of the four modernized Chinese navies in the late Qing dynasty. Among the four, the Beiyang Fleet was particularly sponsored by Li Hongzhang, one of the most trusted vassals of Empress Dowager Cixi and the principal patron of the "self-strengthening movement" in northern China in his capacity as the Viceroy of Zhili and the Minister of Beiyang Commerce (北洋通商大臣). Due to Li's influence in the imperial court, the Beiyang Fleet garnered much greater resources than the other Chinese fleets and soon became the dominant navy in Asia before the onset of the 1894–1895 First Sino-Japanese War. It was the largest fleet in Asia and the 8th in the world during the late 1880s in terms of tonnage.

Creation 

The creation of the Beiyang Fleet dated back to 1871, when four ships from the southern provinces were shifted north to patrol the northern waters. The Beiyang fleet was initially considered to be the weakest of the four Chinese regional navies. This soon changed when Li Hongzhang allotted the majority of naval funds to the Beiyang Fleet. In 1884, on the eve of the Sino-French War, the Beiyang Fleet was the second-largest regional navy but was gradually closing the gap with the Nanyang Fleet, based at Shanghai. By 1890, it was the largest of China's four regional navies.

Unlike the other Chinese fleets, the Beiyang Fleet consisted mostly of battleships imported from Germany and Great Britain.

The Qing Chinese navy at its peak consisted of 78 ships, with a total tonnage of 83,900 tons. However, construction of new ships almost completely stopped in 1888 owing to the Qing dynasty's high expenditures in other fields. Grand Tutor Weng Tonghe advised the Guangxu Emperor to cut all funding to the navy and army, because he did not see Japan as a true threat, and there were several natural disasters during the early 1890s which the emperor thought to be more pressing to expend funds on. Because of the lack of funding, the training of the fleet and personnel essentially came to a standstill, which eventually contributed to its defeat in the Battle of the Yalu River against Japan. Much of the diverted funding was re-directed to the renovation and repairs of the New Summer Palace and construction of a marble boat a total of $12mil was diverted from the naval fund between 1889 and 1894.

Prior to 1888 the budget of the Beiyang fleet was two million taels however in 1888 the Beiyang fleet was formally subordinated to the Navy Yamen (the Qing equivalent to a naval ministry) this saw the budget reduced to 1.3 million taels and in 1891 the Hubu recommended against the purchasing of large guns for the navy and in favour of the reduction of naval personnel, this made any effort of modernisation or even maintenance extremely difficult and meant that many of the Chinese ships went into action in the first Sino-Japanese war.

The British naval officer Captain William Lang was recruited by Hart and Li Hongzhi in 1882 to advise the Chinese in naval matters.

Other foreign officers hired include:
 Constantin von Hanneken a German gunnery training expert he was the highest ranked foreign advisor within the fleet who also designed the Weihaiwei and Port Arthur coastal defences he was appointed co-admiral of the fleet alongside Ding Ruchang.
 William Ferdinand Tyler a former sub-lieutenant in the Royal Navy Reserves and an official within the Imperial Maritime customs service initially an advisor following his volunteering for service he was appointed co-captain of the Dingyuan.
 Philo Norton McGiffin an American graduate of the U.S. Naval Academy who volunteered for service in China 1885 as an advisor initially an instructor at the Tianjin Naval academy he was appointed superintendent of the new Weihaiwei naval academy in 1890 during the First Sino-Japanese war he was appointed co-captain of the Zhenyuan.

Personnel 
The Fuzhou academy in the Fuzhou arsenal established in 1866 produced many naval officers which Li hired for the Beiyang navy however the academy also had to provide officers for the other three fleets and with the academy producing only 630 cadets over a 14-year period this was insufficient and Li established the Beiyang naval college in 1880 which produced 300 cadets within the same 14-year period however Fuzhou graduates still composed the majority of the graduates in the fleet. Nonetheless, these two academies only provided basic and general naval training which was insufficient for a modern fleet so 35 cadets were sent to study in the Royal Naval College Greenwich, Royal Artillery academy Woolwich and others with a more practical assignment in the Royal Navy itself when these students returned to China they were appointed captains this meant a minimum of 636 trained cadets in a fleet numbering 4,000.

Senior command of the fleet however went to Ding Ruchang, an army officer without any formal training who was noted for his courage and capability in land affairs therefore William Lang was appointed as Chief Inspector of the Beiyang navy in 1882 and re-appointed for another term in 1885 however Lang resigned following the Flag-hoisting incident where Beiyang officers refused to hoist the Admiral's flag due to Ding Ruchang's absence Lang felt insulted when Li did not support him and Lang resigned in anger.

Naval Bases 
It was necessary for a modern fleet to possess fortified dockyards and vases for the maintenance and repair of ships of that navy. Li Hongzhang endeavoured therefore to create the necessary support needed for the fleet. The remit of the Beiyang fleet was the protection of the coastal waters between the mouth of the Yalu river and the bay of Jiaozhou a large section of the coastline and an important one as it guarded the Bohai bay and therefore the approaches to Tianjin and the capital Beijing. Li decided to fortify the ports of Lushunkou, Weihaiwei and Tianjin that formed a triangle within the Bohai bay.

Tianjin/Dagu 
This port at the mouth of the Hai river and the port city of the capital Beijing was strategically important and was also the headquarters of the entirety of the Beiyang fleet. The base also hosted the Dagu shipyards, the Tianjin Arsenal, the Tianjin Naval college, the Beiyang Military Academy. The base at Tianjin hosted the telegraph office and academy of the fleet making it important for communication as well as a medical academy and a hospital for naval personnel the torpedo and mining detachments also had their headquarters based in the base.

Weihaiwei 
This city sits at the Northeastern tip of the Shandong peninsula and guarded the southern entrance to the Bohai bay. The harbour of Weihai was guarded by Liugong Island and had excellent deep waters for the basing of large warships. The naval base was established in 1887 due to the limited budget of the fleet soon the harbour was fortified, with an arsenal including a torpedo factory being constructed too, other facilities included an ammunition depot and coaling facilities important for the fleet.

Lushunkou 
This base sat at the southeastern tip of the Liaodong peninsula and guarded the northern entrance to the Bohai bay. Construction of the base was given particular priority, and a French syndicate constructed most of the facilities; the construction ran from 1880 to 1890 and cost approximately three million taels. The port also hosted torpedo and mining facilities and hosted a large dockyard the only one capable of repairing the Dingyuan class battleships. Port Arthur was of particular importance that the Navy Regulations stipulated half the year must be spent there by senior officers of the fleet. However, there is controversy over the decision to adopt Lushunkou as the primary base given its relative isolation something that proved particularly important in the First Sino-Japanese war, this was explained as being necessary as Li as the limited budget of the fleet meant that despite Qingdao being the superior naval base with a larger and more amenable bay the financial capacity to establish a base was not sufficient.

Sino-French War 
The Beiyang Fleet took good care to stay out of range of Admiral Amédée Courbet's Far East Squadron during the Sino-French War (August 1884 – April 1885). Nevertheless, it featured prominently in the calculations of the French government between 1883 and 1885. In December 1883, as war with China seemed increasingly likely, the French persuaded the German government to delay the release of these three ships. They did not reach China until the autumn of 1885, after the end of the Sino-French War.

Although war was clearly imminent, France and China remained technically at peace, and Lespès was forbidden to attack the Beiyang Fleet pending the outcome of diplomatic efforts to resolve the crisis. On 3 July 1884 the Beiyang Fleet's commander, Admiral Ding Ruchang (丁汝昌), withdrew his ships from Che-foo to Pei-ho, where a strong bar across the harbour protected them from the French ships. The fleet remained at Pei-ho in almost complete idleness throughout the Sino-French War.

The two ships set sail for Shanghai to join the Nanyang vessels, but were almost immediately recalled by Li Hongzhang, who claimed that they were needed to watch the Japanese in Korea. The result was the loss of two Chinese warships from the Nanyang Fleet at the Battle of Shipu (14 February 1885). Li's selfish attitude was neither forgotten nor forgiven, and in the First Sino-Japanese War the Nanyang Fleet made little attempt to help the Beiyang Fleet.

Composition, 1894

In 1894, on the eve of the war with Japan, the Beiyang Fleet was in theory the most powerful fleet in Asia. It was only one of China's four regional fleets, but in numbers it equalled Japan's entire fleet. The pride of the Beiyang Fleet were the German-built steel turret battleships Dingyuan (定遠) and Zhenyuan (鎮遠).

Between 1881 and 1889 the Beiyang Fleet acquired a squadron of eight protected or armoured cruisers, most of which were built in either Britain or Germany. The cruisers Chaoyong (超勇) and Yangwei (揚威), which joined the fleet in 1881 and which Li Hongzhang prudently kept far from the scene of action during the Sino-French War, were products of Laird's yard, Birkenhead. Another pair of protected cruisers, Chingyuan (靖遠) and Zhiyuan (致遠), were built by Armstrong Whitworth at its new Elswick yard in 1887. The latter pair were a class loosely known as the "Elswick Cruisers", ships built for export under a generally similar design. These cruisers were fast (25 knots) and heavily armed, but were not adopted by the Royal Navy because the Admiralty considered them to be "weak in structure". The Admiralty view proved correct when both Chinese ships were lost in the Sino-Japanese War. (So were the Japanese Elswick CruisersYoshino and Takasago during the 1904 Russo-Japanese War, though not for the design reasons – the first was accidentally rammed, and the second struck a mine and blew up.) These foreign-built ships were joined in 1889 by the armoured cruiser Pingyuan, a product of the Foochow Navy Yard originally named Longwei (Lung-wei, 龍威).

The Beiyang Fleet also included six steel but unarmoured British-built gunboats, delivered in 1879. These gunboats, of identical specifications, were named respectively Zhenbei ("Guard the north"), Zhendong ("Guard the east"), Zhennan ("Guard the south"), Zhenxi ("Guard the west"), Zhenbian ("Guard the frontier") and Zhenzhong ("Guard the interior"). The first four ships were originally to have been allocated to the Nanyang Fleet, but Li Hongzhang was so impressed with their quality that he took them over for the Beiyang Fleet, compensating the Nanyang Fleet with four elderly gunboats that had served with the Beiyang Fleet since 1876.

The Beiyang Fleet also possessed an array of small torpedo boats. Exact numbers are uncertain, because these craft were not systematically listed, but some details are known. Four 16-ton torpedo boats were built in 1883 at the Vulcan yard in Stettin for the use of the steel battleships Dingyuan and Zhenyuan. These four craft, known respectively as Dingyuan No. 1 and No. 2 and Zhenyuan No. 1 and No. 2, were delayed in harbour by the Germans during the Sino-French War along with their mother ships, and joined the Beiyang Fleet in October 1885.

Battleships

Cruisers

Gunboats

Torpedo boats

Torpedo boats
 Left Fleet 1 "左隊一號"
 Left Fleet 2 "左隊二號"
 Left Fleet 3 "左隊三號"
 Right Fleet 1 "右隊一號"
 Right Fleet 2 "右隊二號"
 Right Fleet 3 "右隊三號"
  "福龍"
 "捷順"

Training ships
 Kangji "康濟"
 Weiyuan *"威遠"
 "敏捷"

Auxiliary ships
 "泰安"
 Zhenhai "鎮海"
 Caojiang "操江"
 "湄云"

Transport
 Liyun "利運"

First Sino-Japanese War and demise 

Claiming her responsibilities on Choson affairs, in 1894, the Imperial Japanese Navy launched the First Sino-Japanese War against China. Due to the lack of government funding and the intensive Japanese naval program, Beiyang's once superior resources were becoming outdated. By the time of the Battle of Yalu River (1894), the Beiyang Fleet suffered heavy losses due to the surprise attack of the Japanese and the inferiority of its equipment, and was eventually annihilated in the Battle of Weihaiwei.

Minor attempts to rebuild the fleet were made after the war, but the Beiyang Navy was never to reattain its former significance. From 1896 to 1899 the fleet received new ships from Germany and the United Kingdom, including the s Hai Qi and Hai Tien that arrived in Dagū, where they became part of the reorganized Beiyang Fleet at the time of the Boxer Rebellion.

In 1909 the Beiyang and Nanyang fleets were merged and re-organised into the Sea Fleet and the River Fleet.

Ships of the Beiyang Fleet

Popular Culture
A manhua titled Iron Ladies named one of their great interstellar fleet as Beiyang Fleet. Ding Yuan and Zhen Yuan were both female characters, Ding Yuan is the Heaven tier warrior, Zhen Yuan is the Earth tier warrior. Their fleet was led by Mu Siyun, a newly recruited admiral, and the only Soul tier in existence.

See also 
 Beiyang Army
 Self-Strengthening Movement
 Anthem of the Beiyang Fleet

Notes

References
 Arlington, L. C., Through the Dragon's Eyes (London, 1931)
 Loir, M., L'escadre de l'amiral Courbet (Paris, 1886)
 Lung Chang [龍章], Yueh-nan yu Chung-fa chan-cheng [越南與中法戰爭, Vietnam and the Sino-French War] (Taipei, 1993
 Rawlinson, J., China's Struggle for Naval Development, 1839–1895 (Harvard, 1967)
 Wright, R., The Chinese Steam Navy, 1862–1945 (London, 2001)

External links 

 Travel Guide on the Ting Yuen
 Beiyang.org 
 Beiyang Navy 

 
Chinese fleets
Military history of the Qing dynasty
Naval history of China
Sino-French War